Fool Canada is a Canadian television series, airing on CBC Television in summer 2015.

Hosted by comedian Will Sasso, the program features Sasso and other cast members, including Craig Lauzon, Sam Kalilieh and Sara Hennessey, performing hidden camera pranks in various locations across Canada. The series is based on the British comedy series Fool Britannia.

The show premiered on June 23, 2015.

References

2015 Canadian television series debuts
2015 Canadian television series endings
CBC Television original programming
Television series by Shaftesbury Films
2010s Canadian comedy television series